Northfield Mountain is a pumped-storage hydroelectric plant and reservoir located on and under the similarly named Northfield Mountain in Erving and Northfield, Massachusetts.  It is currently owned by FirstLight Power Resources (formerly NE Energy), which purchased the facility from Northeast Utilities in 2006.

History
Engineering studies for the plant began in October 1964, with early site preparation starting three years later. In 1972 its 1,168 megawatt hydroelectric plant became operational as the largest such facility in the world. The facility was built to balance the supply from the nearby Vermont Yankee Nuclear Power Plant.

Design
The plant was built entirely underground, and located about  up the Connecticut River from Turners Falls Dam. During periods of lower electrical power demand, the plant pumps water from this lower reservoir through the Northfield Mountain Tailrace Tunnel to a man-made upper reservoir. At times of high demand, water is released to flow downhill from this upper reservoir through a turbine generator, where it then collects in the lower reservoir to be stored until again pumped to the upper reservoir.

The turbines can ramp up in 10 minutes, and deliver full power for 8 hours.

References

External links

 

Energy infrastructure completed in 1972
Pumped-storage hydroelectric power stations in the United States
Hydroelectric power plants in Massachusetts